Opportunity may refer to:

Places
 Opportunity, Montana, an unincorporated community, United States
 Opportunity, Nebraska, an unincorporated community, United States
 Opportunity, Washington, a former census-designated place, United States
 39382 Opportunity, an asteroid

Arts, entertainment, and media

Music
 "Opportunity" (Pete Murray song), 2006
 "Opportunity", a song by The Charlatans
 "Opportunity", a song from Annie
 "Opportunities (Let's Make Lots of Money)", a song by Pet Shop Boys

Other uses in arts, entertainment, and media
 Opportunity (film), a 1918 film
 Opportunity: A Journal of Negro Life, a literary periodical of the Harlem Renaissance
 The Opportunity, a 17th-century play

Finance
 Opportunity International, a microfinance network that lends to the working poor
 Opportunity NYC, a 2007–2012 experimental conditional cash transfer program in New York City

Other uses
 Opportunity (rover), a robotic rover on Mars
 Business opportunity
 Equal opportunity
 Market opportunity
 Means, motive, and opportunity, a popular cultural summation of the three aspects of a crime needed to convince a jury of guilt
 Political opportunity
 Window of opportunity

See also 

 Crisis
 Danger (disambiguation)
 Launch window
 Opportunism
 Opportunity cost